The Laguna Beach Fire Department is the agency that provides fire protection and emergency medical services for Laguna Beach, California.

Stations & Apparatus

References

Fire departments in California
Laguna Beach, California
Emergency services in Orange County, California